The lesser tube-nosed bat (Nyctimene minutus) is a species of megabat in the family Pteropodidae. It is native to two of the Maluku Islands (Spice Islands) in northern Indonesia.

Taxonomy
The lesser tube-nosed bat was described as a new species in 1910 by Danish mammalogist Knud Andersen. The holotype had been collected by Alfred Russel Wallace in Tondano, Indonesia. Two subspecies are recognized, with Andersen also the taxonomic authority: N. m. minutus and N. m. varius.

Description

Range and status
The bat is endemic to the mountainous forests of Buru and Seram Islands, in Maluku Province. It is not found on nearby Ambon Island. Its habitat is mid-montane forests.

In 2008, it was evaluated as a vulnerable species by the IUCN.

References

Nyctimene (genus)
Bats of Indonesia
Endemic fauna of Indonesia
Endemic fauna of Seram Island
Fauna of Buru
Vulnerable fauna of Asia
Vulnerable fauna of Oceania
Mammals described in 1910
Taxa named by Knud Andersen
Taxonomy articles created by Polbot